Dustin Clifman Corea Garay (born March 21, 1992) is an professional footballer who plays as a winger for  Primera División club Águila. Born in the United States, he represents the El Salvador national team at international level.

High school
Dustin Corea attended Milwaukie High School, which he graduated in 2010. He was rewarded the "Oregon 6A State Player of the Year" award in 2009, the first player in at least 22 years to win the award without making a state playoff appearance. He was also rewarded the "Three Rivers League Player of the Year" award in the same year. Between 2007 and 2009, Corea was included in the league's Best XI. In his 3 year high school soccer career, Corea scored 46 goals with 21 assists in 43 matches played. In 2006, he scored 6 goals with 7 assists in 15 matches. In 2007, Corea scored 14 goals with 7 assists in 14 matches for a school record for goals in one season. In 2009, Corea scored 26 goals with 7 assists in 14 matches for another school record for goals in one season.

Club career
Corea was invited to trial with several teams in 2010: Juventus, Fiorentina, Palermo, Club Brugge. Nothing came of these trials and he decided to try his luck in his fathers native country of El Salvador.

On July 13, 2011, Corea signed with Atlético Marte of El Salvador for six months.

Corea played 25 minutes in a friendly game with Atlético Marte. A few days later it was announced that he would incorporate into Blokhus FC from Denmark. Corea was granted permission to leave Marte as a clause in his contract stated that if a European club were to become interested in Corea, he would be allowed to leave if desired.

On January 29, 2013, Corea signed a six-month loan deal with Danish team Skive IK. On March 13 he signed a -year contract with Skive IK, beginning at the end of the loan deal binding him to Skive IK til the end of 2015. On September 2, 2014 Corea's contract with Skive IK was cancelled by mutual consent.

On January 4, 2015 Corea signed a one-year contract with Salvadoran Champions CD FAS.

On July 30, 2015, Corea signed with NASL club FC Edmonton. Corea would spend three seasons in Edmonton. After the 2017 season, with the future of FC Edmonton and the NASL in doubt, Corea was released from FC Edmonton.

International career

United States
The Oregon native took part at the 2009 CONCACAF U-17 Championship, in which the United States U-17 qualified to the 2009 FIFA U-17 World Cup. He was not chosen to participate in the U-17 World Cup competition.

El Salvador
The "Ghost", as he is popularly known, gained notoriety with his goals against Costa Rica at the 2011 CONCACAF U-20 Championship qualifying, which in turn, by an administrative error on the part of the Salvadoran Football Association, left the El Salvador U-20 out of the 2010 CONCACAF U-20 Championship that was held in Guatemala. Corea played for the U.S. U-17, for which the FESFUT must have sent a letter to FIFA in request for an association change, which was not done. Therefore, El Salvador was disallowed for continuation.

After the disqualification it was unclear whether or not the "Ghost" could play for El Salvador in any competition. FESFUT had sent a letter to the FIFA for permission on Corea's behalf. It was until July 1, 2011 that the Fédération Internationale de Football Association (FIFA) sent the notice of the decision of the "sole judge of the Players' Status Committee," on changing the player's association. The decision was approved of the change and, therefore, Corea can represent El Salvador.

On March 11, 2013 Dustin Corea was called up for the El Salvador national squad and got his debut as he started in and played for the first 56 minutes at a friendly against Ecuador on March 21 – on his 21st birthday.

Career statistics
Scores and results list El Salvador's goal tally first.

References

External links

Player Profile

Living people
1992 births
Citizens of El Salvador through descent
American people of Nicaraguan descent
Salvadoran people of Nicaraguan descent
American sportspeople of Salvadoran descent
Salvadoran footballers
Soccer players from Los Angeles
Soccer players from Oregon
Association football forwards
El Salvador international footballers
El Salvador youth international footballers
United States men's youth international soccer players
Danish 1st Division players
Superettan players
North American Soccer League players
Jammerbugt FC players
Jönköpings Södra IF players
Skive IK players
C.D. Atlético Marte footballers
FC Edmonton players
Miami FC players
C.D. FAS footballers
2013 CONCACAF Gold Cup players
2015 CONCACAF Gold Cup players
Salvadoran expatriate footballers
Salvadoran expatriate sportspeople in Denmark
Expatriate men's footballers in Denmark
Salvadoran expatriate sportspeople in Sweden
Expatriate footballers in Sweden
Salvadoran expatriate sportspeople in Guatemala
Expatriate footballers in Guatemala